Camille Neumann (born 28 September 1956) is a retired Luxembourgian football midfielder.

References

1956 births
Living people
Luxembourgian footballers
FC Progrès Niederkorn players
Association football midfielders
Luxembourg international footballers